Stenolophus is a genus of ground beetle native to the Palearctic (including Europe), the Nearctic, the Near East, and North Africa. It contains the following species:

 Stenolophus abdominalis Gene, 1836 
 Stenolophus abstinens Casey, 1914 
 Stenolophus agonoides Bates, 1883 
 Stenolophus alacer Peringuey, 1896 
 Stenolophus anceps Leconte, 1857 
 Stenolophus andrewesi Landin, 1955 
 Stenolophus angolanus (Basilewsky, 1948) 
 Stenolophus arcuaticollis N.Ito, 1997 
 Stenolophus asakawaensis Habu, 1973 
 Stenolophus badius Erichson, 1847 
 Stenolophus bajaurae (Andrewes, 1924) 
 Stenolophus balli (Basilewsky, 1947) 
 Stenolophus basirufus (Basilewsky, 1948) 
 Stenolophus binotatus (Casey, 1914) 
 Stenolophus bousqueti N.Ito, 1997 
 Stenolophus brevicornis (Jeannel, 1948) 
 Stenolophus brittoni (Basilewsky, 1948) 
 Stenolophus caeruleus Blackburn, 1890 
 Stenolophus capensis Peringuey, 1896 
 Stenolophus carbo Bousquet in Bousquet & Larochelle, 1993 
 Stenolophus castaneipennis Bates, 1873 
 Stenolophus charis Bates, 1892 
 Stenolophus cincticollis Leconte, 1858 
 Stenolophus cinctipennis Boheman, 1858 
 Stenolophus collarti (Basilewsky, 1948) 
 Stenolophus columbinus Erichson, 1843 
 Stenolophus comma (Fabricius, 1775) 
 Stenolophus comptus Erichson, 1843 
 Stenolophus concinnus Dejean, 1829 
 Stenolophus congoensis (Burgeon, 1936) 
 Stenolophus conjunctus (Say, 1823) 
 Stenolophus connotatus Bates, 1873 
 Stenolophus cruentatus Chevrolat, 1858 
 Stenolophus cyclops (Darlington, 1968) 
 Stenolophus debilis Erichson, 1847 
 Stenolophus difficilis (Hope, 1845) 
 Stenolophus discophorus (Fischer, 1823) 
 Stenolophus discriminatus (Basilewsky, 1948) 
 Stenolophus dissimilis Dejean, 1829 
 Stenolophus doiinthanonus N.Ito, 2000 
 Stenolophus dollmani (Basilewsky, 1946) 
 Stenolophus dorsalis Motschulsky, 1864 
 Stenolophus dorsiger Fairmaire, 1868 
 Stenolophus dumainei Coquerel, 1866 
 Stenolophus electus (Basilewsky, 1948) 
 Stenolophus extensicollis Casey, 1924 
 Stenolophus fenestratus (Burgeon, 1936) 
 Stenolophus flavipes Leconte, 1858 
 Stenolophus fugax Dejean, 1829 
 Stenolophus fukiensis (Jedlicka, 1953) 
 Stenolophus fuliginosus Dejean, 1829 
 Stenolophus fulvicornis Bates, 1873 
 Stenolophus fuscatus Dejean, 1829 
 Stenolophus germanus Chaudoir, 1878 
 Stenolophus gonidius Bates, 1890 
 Stenolophus humeralis (Dejean, 1831) 
 Stenolophus humidus Hamilton, 1893 
 Stenolophus impunctatus N.Ito, 2000 
 Stenolophus incultus Casey, 1914 
 Stenolophus infuscatus (Dejean, 1829) 
 Stenolophus interruptus Chaudoir, 1876 
 Stenolophus iridescens Klug, 1833 
 Stenolophus iridicolor L. Redtenbacher, 1867 
 Stenolophus irinorufus Fairmaire, 1878 
 Stenolophus irinoviridis Fairmaire, 1878 
 Stenolophus jeanneli (Basilewsky, 1948) 
 Stenolophus karasawai Tanaka, 1962 
 Stenolophus kivuensis (Burgeon, 1936) 
 Stenolophus kmecoi (Facchini, 2003) 
 Stenolophus kurosai Tanaka, 1962 
 Stenolophus kusamai Habu, 1977 
 Stenolophus lamottei (Basilewsky, 1951) 
 Stenolophus lecontei (Chaudoir, 1868) 
 Stenolophus lentulus Erichson, 1847 
 Stenolophus liebmanni G.Muller, 1931 
 Stenolophus limbalis Leconte, 1857 
 Stenolophus linearis (Jeannel, 1948) 
 Stenolophus lineola (Fabricius, 1775) 
 Stenolophus longicollis Erichson, 1847 
 Stenolophus lucidus Dejean, 1829 
 Stenolophus maculatus (Leconte, 1868) 
 Stenolophus major (Basilewsky, 1968) 
 Stenolophus marginatus Dejean, 1829 
 Stenolophus marshalli (Basilewsky, 1946) 
 Stenolophus megacephalus Lindroth, 1968 
 Stenolophus metrius (Basilewsky, 1951) 
 Stenolophus mexicanus Bates, 1882 
 Stenolophus meyeri Jedlicka, 1935 
 Stenolophus mixtus (Herbst, 1784) 
 Stenolophus mjobergi Kataev, 1997 
 Stenolophus motoensis (Burgeon, 1936) 
 Stenolophus narentinus Drovenik & Peks, 1999 
 Stenolophus natalicus (Peringuey, 1896) 
 Stenolophus neghellianus (G.Muller, 1942) 
 Stenolophus nepalensis (Jedlicka, 1965) 
 Stenolophus nigerianus (Basilewsky, 1951) 
 Stenolophus nigridius Andrewes, 1947 
 Stenolophus nitens (Motschulsky, 1864) 
 Stenolophus nitidulus Boheman, 1848 
 Stenolophus obockianus (Fairmaire, 1892) 
 Stenolophus obscurus (Blackburn, 1888) 
 Stenolophus ochropezus (Say, 1823) 
 Stenolophus opaculus Bates, 1886 
 Stenolophus pallipes (Perroud & Montrouzier, 1864) 
 Stenolophus parallelus (Mjoberg, 1905) 
 Stenolophus parviceps (Casey, 1914) 
 Stenolophus pauliani (Basilewsky, 1948) 
 Stenolophus paulinoi Heyden, 1891 
 Stenolophus peregrinus Casey, 1914 
 Stenolophus perrieri (Jeannel, 1948) 
 Stenolophus persimilis N.Ito, 2000 
 Stenolophus piceus (Guerin-Meneville, 1830) 
 Stenolophus plagiatus Gorham, 1901 
 Stenolophus plagifer (Klug, 1853) 
 Stenolophus planicostatus (Basilewsky, 1951) 
 Stenolophus plebejus Dejean, 1829 
 Stenolophus polygenus Bates, 1886 
 Stenolophus promptus Klug, 1853 
 Stenolophus propinquus A.Morawitz, 1862 
 Stenolophus proximus Dejean, 1829 
 Stenolophus pseudoobockianus Felix & Muilwijk, 2009 
 Stenolophus quadratus N.Ito, 2000 
 Stenolophus quadrimaculatus (W.J.Macleay, 1888) 
 Stenolophus quadripustulatus (Dejean, 1829) 
 Stenolophus quadriseriatus Schuler, 1970 
 Stenolophus quinquepustulatus (Wiedemann, 1823) 
 Stenolophus rectifrons (Bates, 1892) 
 Stenolophus relucens Erichson, 1843 
 Stenolophus remissus Casey, 1914 
 Stenolophus rhodesianus (Basilewsky, 1948) 
 Stenolophus robustus Sloane, 1907 
 Stenolophus rotundatus Leconte, 1863 
 Stenolophus rotundicollis (Haldeman, 1843) 
 Stenolophus rufithorax Jedlicka, 1960 
 Stenolophus rufiventris Laferte-Senectere, 1853 
 Stenolophus rufoabdominalis Kataev, 1997 
 Stenolophus rufolimbatus (Jedlicka, 1935) 
 Stenolophus rugicollis (Leconte, 1859) 
 Stenolophus ruwenzoricus (Burgeon, 1936) 
 Stenolophus satoi Habu, 1973 
 Stenolophus scapularis (Dejean, 1831) 
 Stenolophus schaubergeri (Jedlicka, 1935) 
 Stenolophus schoutedeni (Burgeon, 1936) 
 Stenolophus semitinctus Casey, 1914 
 Stenolophus senegalensis (Lecordier, 1978) 
 Stenolophus shirakii Habu, 1973 
 Stenolophus sicardi Jeannel, 1948 
 Stenolophus silvestrii Basilewsky, 1951 
 Stenolophus sinensis Tschitscherine, 1897 
 Stenolophus skrimshiranus Stephens, 1828 
 Stenolophus smaragdulus (Fabricius, 1798) 
 Stenolophus splendidulus Motschulsky, 1864 
 Stenolophus splendidus Motschulsky, 1864 
 Stenolophus spretus Dejean, 1831 
 Stenolophus steveni Krynicki, 1832 
 Stenolophus straneoi (G. Muller, 1942) 
 Stenolophus suturalis W.J. Macleay, 1888 
 Stenolophus szetschuanus (Jedlicka, 1935) 
 Stenolophus taoi Kasahara, 1989 
 Stenolophus terminalis (Peringuey, 1896) 
 Stenolophus tessellatus (Peringuey, 1892) 
 Stenolophus teutonus (Schrank, 1781) 
 Stenolophus trichotichnoides N.Ito, 2000 
 Stenolophus trivittis Fairmaire, 1868 
 Stenolophus uenoi Habu, 1975 
 Stenolophus unicolor Dejean, 1829 
 Stenolophus urundianus (Basilewsky, 1956) 
 Stenolophus ussuricus Kataev & Dudko, 1997 
 Stenolophus vandenbulckei (Basilewsky, 1951) 
 Stenolophus variolatus (Basilewsky, 1956) 
 Stenolophus viridescens Jedlicka, 1935 
 Stenolophus volucer Andrewes, 1930
 Stenolophus yonaguniensis Habu, 1977 
 Stenolophus yunnanus (Jedlicka, 1935) 
 Stenolophus zambezianus (Basilewsky, 1948) 
 Stenolophus zarcoi (Basilewsky, 1952)

References

External links
Stenolophus at Fauna Europaea

 
Harpalinae